Al-Hadab is a mountain in Saudi Arabia  it is located at 20°46′45″N 40°47′54″e and is 2647m or 8684 feet in height above sea level.

References

Mountains of Saudi Arabia